Woodford is a historic home located at Simons Corner, Richmond County, Virginia. It dates to the mid-18th century, and is a small -story, three-bay, vernacular brick dwelling. It features a clipped gable roof and exterior end chimneys. The house was restored in the 1930s.  At that time, a -story frame wing and porch were added.

It was added to the National Register of Historic Places in 1983.

References

Houses on the National Register of Historic Places in Virginia
Houses in Richmond County, Virginia
National Register of Historic Places in Richmond County, Virginia